Beaver Dam High School is a public high school located in Beaver Dam, Wisconsin. It is a part of the Beaver Dam Unified School District.  it had an enrollment of 1,045 students. Its mascot is the Golden Beaver.

Extracurricular activities

Athletics

Fall
 Cross country (M, W)
 Football (M)
 Soccer (M)
 Tennis (W)
 Volleyball (W)
 Swimming (W)
 Golf (W)

Winter
 Basketball (M,W)
 Varsity Cheerleading (M,F)
 Ice Hockey (M, W)
 Swimming (M)
 Wrestling (M, W)
 Powerlifting

Spring
 Baseball (M)
 Golf (M,  W)
 Soccer (W)
 Softball (W)
 Tennis (M)
 Track (M,W)

Clubs
Anime
 BDHS orchestra
 BDHS bands
 Marching band
 Jazz band 1 & 2
 Pep band
 Choirs
 Concert choir
 Treble choir
 Bel Canto Choir
 DECA
 FFA
 Forensics
 Powerlifting
 Mock trial
 National Honor Society
 Key Club
 Student council
 SWAZZ
 Theatre

Gallery

Notable alumni

Science, media and the arts
 Lois J. Ehlert – Artist, award-winning author, Caldecott Medal recipient, & Illustrator of Children’s Books
 Raymond Z. Gallun – Pioneer science fiction author
 Dave Krause, BSEM, UW-Madison – NASA Sounding Rocket Chief Engineer
 Fred MacMurray – Actor
 David Alan Smith - Actor

Business
 Benjamin Murray – President of XOJET, Pittsburgh Pirates baseball draft
 Gerald H. Teletzke – Business and engineer leader

Government
 Robert G. Ehlenfeldt – Wisconsin State Veterinarian
 Leon Epstein – Professor of Political Science, University of Wisconsin—Madison
 James J. Healy – National labor relations leader, adviser to presidents Kennedy and Carter, Harvard Business School professor, lecturer, author
 Robert Kastenmeier – Wisconsin Representative to U.S. Congress
 Fred McFarlane – Professor in Rehabilitation Counseling, San Diego State University
 Mary Ann Spellman – Two-term Beaver Dam mayor
 Joseph M. Stehling – Brigadier General, recipient of Purple Heart, Legion of Merit

Professional sports
 Eric Baldwin – Professional poker player and 2009 Cardplayer of the year
 Madeline "Maddy" Horn – Speed skater
 Bill Rentmeester – Professional football player
R.J. Shelton - Professional football player

References

External links
Beaver Dam High School website

Public high schools in Wisconsin
Schools in Dodge County, Wisconsin
Beaver Dam, Wisconsin